Katarzyna Emanuela Pisarska (born 23 May 1981) is a Polish social entrepreneur, civic activist and academic, specializing in diplomacy and foreign policy.

She is the founder and chairwoman of the European Academy of Diplomacy in Warsaw, Poland and the Visegrad School of Political Studies run in cooperation with the Council of Europe. She is the co-founder and chairwomen of the Casimir Pulaski Foundation and the Warsaw security forum and an associate professor at the Warsaw School of Economics. Since 2020 she is the vice-president of European Forum Alpbach in Austria.

In 2014 she was nominated a Young Global Leader of the World Economic Forum in Geneva and in 2021 became a Munich Young Leader of the Munich Security Conference.

Education and academic career 
Pisarska is a graduate of the University of Łódź (1998-2003), Warsaw School of Economics (2001-2003) and the College of Europe (2003-2004), having received MA degrees in International Relations and European Integration. In 2009 she has obtained a PhD in economics at the Warsaw School of Economics and in 2018 a post-doctoral degree (habilitacja) in political science at the Faculty of International and Political Studies of the University of Łódź.

Katarzyna Pisarska is an associate professor at the Warsaw School of Economics. She specializes in EU foreign policy, EU-Russia relations, Eastern Partnership, as well as public diplomacy. Pisarska's research focuses on the role of civil society in the realization of foreign policy goals.  She is the author of the book "The Domestic Dimension of Public Diplomacy - Evaluating Success through Civil Engagement" (Palgrave 2016).

Previously, Pisarska was a Fulbright Visiting Fellow at Harvard University (2007), a Visiting Scholar at Johns Hopkins University’s School of Advanced International Studies (2010), at the University of Oslo (2012)at the Australian National University (2015) and the University of Southern California (2019).

Pisarska has completed executive leadership courses at the Harvard Kennedy School (2016), the Saïd Business School at the Oxford University  (2017) and a module devoted to sustainable environmental policies at Princeton University (2018).

Social and public engagement 
Pisarska was one of the co-founders and later President (2004-2008) of the Polish Forum of Young Diplomats. In 2013, in partnership with the Council of Europe, she created a regional leadership school: the Visegrad School of Political Studies.

Pisarska served as an adviser to the Foreign Affairs Committee of the Parliament of Poland, to the Office of National Security at the Chancellery of the President of the Republic of Poland; and continues to work as regular foreign affairs broadcaster in Polish and international media, including as a regular commentator in Radio Tok.fm.

Since 2020 she is the Vice-President of European Forum Alpbach in Austria.

Awards and honors 
Munich Young Leader, Munich Security Forum (2021/2022) 
Young Global Leader, World Economic Forum, Davos (since 2014), Member of the YGL Advisory Council (since 2018)
The Bekker Program Award for Most Outstanding Polish Scholars (2018).
 VIP Alumni of the University of Łódź Award (2016)
 "99 under the age of 33 most influential world foreign policy leaders", Diplomatic Courier, Washington D.C. (2013).
Fulbright Research Fellowship at Harvard University (2007)

Bibliography

Books 
 K. Pisarska (2016), The Domestic Dimension of Public Diplomacy – Evaluating Success through Civil Engagement, London: Palgrave McMillan.
 K. Pisarska (2003), The Polish American community's lobbying for Poland's inclusion into NATO, Wydawnictwo Mediton, Łódź

Selected articles 
 K. Pisarska (2019), Strengthening European Defense Capabilities: A Polish Perspective, Georgetown Journal of International Affairs. 
 K. Pisarska (2019),  Why Europe's Elections Matter in Poland, The Atlantic Council.
K. Pisarska (2019), Conducting Elite Interviews in an International Context: Lessons From the World of Public Diplomacy, SAGE Research Methods Cases Part 2.
 K. Pisarska (2017), “A Future for the EU Army? A Step-by-Step Approach”, FKP Policy Paper, The Casimir Pulaski Foundation 
 K. Pisarska (2017), “Patterns of Polish-German Reconciliation – Are They Transferable into International Politics?”, in: The German-Polish Reconciliation Policies: Insights for the Koreas, eds. K. Kozłowski I K. Stuewe, Oficyna Wydawnicza SGH, s. 81–98.
 K. Pisarska (2016), “Soft Power in North America and Europe”, in: Routledge Handbook of Soft Power, edited by Naren Chitty, Craig Hayden, Li Ji, Gary Rawnsley, John Simons, Routledge.
 K. Pisarska (2015) „How the Promise of Europe Has Been Fulfilled”, Europe Needs Swagger – CNBC Special Report, 14 October 2015.
 K. Pisarska (2015), „Central Europe and the Immigrant Crisis: Understanding the East-West European Divide”, The Australian Outlook, Australian Institute of International Affairs, Canberra.
 K. Pisarska (2015), “Poland’s strategic awakening: a new leader appears”, The Strategist, Australian Strategic Policy Institute, Canberra, 6 May 2015.
 K. Pisarska (2015), „Peace Diplomacy and the Domestic Dimension of Norwegian Foreign Policy: The Insider’s Accounts”, Scandinavian Political Studies Volume 38, Issue 2, p. 198–215.
 K. Pisarska (2014), “How Visegradians can emulate the Scandinavians in telling their story to the world”, CPD Monitor, Vol.6, Issue 2, Summer 2014.
 K. Pisarska (2014), „The role of domestic public engagement in the formulation and implementation of U.S. Government-sponsored Educational Exchanges – an Insider’s Account”, Place Branding & Public Diplomacy, Palgrave McMillan.
 K. Pisarska (2012), „From Great Atlanticists to Great Europeans? The Impact of Obama’s Foreign Policy on Central Europe”, in: Obama, US Politics, and Transatlantic Relations: Change or Continuity?, ed. G. Scott-Smith, Peter Lang Publishers, Frankfurt.
 K. Pisarska (2012), “European Integration Studies in Political Science: the case of Poland”, in: Analyzing European Union Politics, eds. F. Bindi & K. A. Eliassen, Il Mulino, Bologna.
 K. Pisarska (2011), „America and the Eastern Partnership Initiative: From Friend to Meaningful Contributor”, Central European Digest, Issue Brief no. 120, Center for European Policy Analysis, Washington D.C.

References 

Living people
Polish women academics
Academic staff of the SGH Warsaw School of Economics
College of Europe alumni
University of Łódź alumni
SGH Warsaw School of Economics alumni
1981 births